Miguel Ángel Loayza Ríos (21 June 1940 – 19 October 2017) was a football midfielder from Peru. He played for several clubs, notably Argentine clubs Huracán, Boca Juniors and River Plate as well as Colombian club Deportivo Cali. He was famous for his short passing, creativity and excellent dribbling ability, nicknamed "El Maestrito" (The little Master") in Argentina and "El Mago" (The magician'') in Colombia.

Playing career
Born in Loreto, he made his debut for Ciclista Lima in June 1957 and quickly demonstrated his talent. He participated with Peru in the Copa América 1959 making a strong performance with 5 goals in 6 matches. On May 17, 1959 Loayza was part of the Peru national team which demolished to England 4-1 in Lima.

After a successful career in Peru he left his homeland at 19 years of age, to play for Spanish club FC Barcelona, he would not return to play in Peru. He was not able to adapt to European football and Loayza moved on to Argentina to play with Boca Juniors, where he played 3 seasons. He won an Argentine League in 1962.

Loayza also played for a number of other clubs in Argentina including Club Atlético Huracán, Rosario Central and Boca Juniors fiercest rivals River Plate.

In 1969, he joined Deportivo Cali where he was part of the team that won 2 Mustang Cup (1969, 1970) and remains one of their most iconic players. He died on 19 October 2017 in Buenos Aires at the age of 77.

Honors

References

External links
Los años 60 de Huracán
Loayza con Deportivo Cali en Copa Libertadores
Tan real como curioso

1940 births
2017 deaths
Footballers from Lima
Association football midfielders
Peruvian footballers
Peru international footballers
Ciclista Lima Association footballers
FC Barcelona players
Boca Juniors footballers
Rosario Central footballers
Club Atlético Huracán footballers
Club Atlético River Plate footballers
Deportivo Cali footballers
Peruvian expatriate sportspeople in Colombia
Argentine Primera División players
Categoría Primera A players
La Liga players
Peruvian expatriate footballers
Expatriate footballers in Spain
Expatriate footballers in Argentina
Expatriate footballers in Colombia